Thomas Shreve (2 January 1755, New York - 21 August 1816, Lunenburg, Nova Scotia) was a Loyalist during the American Revolution and later served as the first rector of St. George's Anglican Church (Parrsboro, Nova Scotia) (1787) and then became a prominent minister of St. John's Anglican Church (Lunenburg), Nova Scotia.

During the American Revolution he studied at King's College (present-day Columbia University) and then as Assistant Barracks Master. He was a Captain in the De Lancey's Brigade and Lieut. in 82nd Regiment of Foot (1777)).  He came to Nova Scotia as a loyalist and settled in Parrsboro, Nova Scotia (1874). He went to England to become a missionary and joined the Society for the Propagation of the Gospel in Foreign Parts and then returned to be rector at St. George's Anglican Church (Parrsboro, Nova Scotia) (1787). In 1803, he moved to Lunenburg, Nova Scotia and served as their missionary for 13 years until his death in 1816. He was buried in the crypt of St. John's Anglican Church.

References 

History of Nova Scotia
Loyalists who settled Nova Scotia